The 75th Field Artillery Regiment is a field artillery regiment of the United States Army.

History

I was in Bravo Battery 1st Bn 75th Field Artillery stationed in Bamberg Germany from 1976 to 1978. It was an 8-inch Howitzer unit. The Battery had four Howitzers. The Battalion  had a total of 12 Howitzers.  Rick B. 

I was in A Battery, 1st Bn. 75th Field Artillery from 1967 to 1968 At that time it was 8 inch Howitzers stationed in Bamberg, Germany. I was in FDC, and one of the first to be trained on FADAC (Field Artillery Digital Automatic Computer. Initially, we operated out of an M161 (?) personnel carrier, but later out of a five-ton van. It was too rough for FADAC and it had to be repaired many times as the bearings of the hard drive gave out frequently.

I was in the A-Battery, 75th Arty.1st Howitzer Bn. 1959–1962 in Ansbach, Germany. This unit was 8 inch Sp Howitzers.Iwas chief of FDC we operated out of ordinance van.

I joined B-Battery, 75th Arty.1st Howitzer Battalion in Nov 1962. The 1st of the 75th was still in Ansbach when I rotated back to the USA on August 3, 1964. At some time (I Can't recall the exact time) the 1st Battalion of the 75th Artillery transitioned to the 2nd Battalion of the 28th Artillery. The Guns changed from 8 inch to 175mm; I rotated out in June 1965.

Distinctive unit insignia
 Description
A Gold color metal and enamel device 1 5/32 inches (2.94 cm) in height overall consisting of a shield blazoned: Gules, in chief a lizard statant Or. Attached below the shield a Gold scroll inscribed “PARATUS FACERE” in Black letters.
 Symbolism
The shield is red for Artillery, and the gold lizard represents the origin of the 75th Field Artillery in the state of Alabama, Alabama being known as the Lizard State.
 Background
The distinctive unit insignia was originally approved for the 75th Field Artillery Regiment on 8 August 1940. It was amended to correct the description on 29 August 1940. The insignia was redesignated for the 75th Field Artillery Battalion on 10 May 1941. It was redesignated for the 75th Artillery Regiment on 31 October 1958. It was redesignated for the 75th Field Artillery Regiment effective 1 September 1971. The insignia was amended to revise the description on 9 February 1973.

Coat of arms
Blazon
 Shield
Gules, in chief a lizard statant Or.
 Crest
On a wreath of the colors Or and Gules three cannon barrel muzzles adjoining at the top of the first, the outer ones charged with a gunstone the center one with a Taeguk Proper.
Motto
PARATUS FACERE (Prepared To Do).
Symbolism
 Shield
The shield is red for Artillery, and the gold lizard represents the origin of the 75th Field Artillery in the state of Alabama, Alabama being known as the Lizard State.
 Crest
The cannon barrels denote the Artillery heritage of the organization and three are used to refer to the widely separated land areas where the unit served. The outer barrels represent World War II and participation in the Aleutian Islands and Po Valley Campaigns. The center one and Taeguk refer to the Korean War, and together with the gunstones, symbolize the unit's participation in four campaigns, with the Taeguk also denoting the award of the Republic of Korea Presidential Unit Citation.
 Background
The coat of arms was originally approved for the 75th Field Artillery Regiment on 8 August 1940. It was amended to correct the wording of the blazon on 29 August 1940. The insignia was redesignated for the 75th Field Artillery Battalion on 10 May 1941. It was redesignated for the 75th Artillery Regiment on 31 October 1958. It was redesignated for the 75th Field Artillery Regiment effective 1 September 1971. The insignia was amended to add a crest on 9 February 1973.

Current configuration
 1st Battalion 75th Field Artillery Regiment (United States)
 2nd Battalion 75th Field Artillery Regiment (United States)
 3rd Battalion 75th Field Artillery Regiment (United States)
 4th Battalion 75th Field Artillery Regiment (United States)
 5th Battalion 75th Field Artillery Regiment (United States)
 6th Battalion 75th Field Artillery Regiment (United States)

See also
 Field Artillery Branch (United States)

References

 https://web.archive.org/web/20120819131004/http://www.tioh.hqda.pentagon.mil/Heraldry/ArmyDUISSICOA/ArmyHeraldryUnit.aspx?u=3451

External links
 http://www.history.army.mil/html/forcestruc/lineages/branches/fa/default.htm
 http://freepages.genealogy.rootsweb.ancestry.com/~gregkrenzelok/veterinary%20corp%20in%20ww1/75thfabnhistory.html

075
Military units and formations established in 1918